Lathóg of Tír Chonaill (fl. 9th century) was an Irish poet.

Overview
According to a tract seemingly composed well after the 9th century, Lathóg of Tír Chonaill was mother of the poet Flann mac Lonáin. Lathóg once advised Flann to be liberal and open-handed, because the ollamh is bound to give the same hospitality he receives (MacCana, 1974).

A verse
My blessing and my counsel take my son and Aidhne's glory, Flan. Be generous for our honour's sake, since men give all that you demand. Believe your mother's word that still the niggard poet is in the wrong; Give of your riches with good will, you ask rewards from all for song. (Flower, 1947)

References
The Irish Tradition, Robin Flower, 1947
The Rise of the Later Schools of Filidheacht P. MacCana, in Eiru 25, pp. 126–46, 1974.

Irish women poets
9th-century Irish writers
Medieval Irish poets
People from County Donegal
Irish-language writers